Lucas Henrique Barbosa (born 22 February 2001), known as Lucas Barbosa, is a Brazilian footballer who plays as a midfielder for Santos.

Club career

Born in Bebedouro, São Paulo, Lucas Barbosa started his career at hometown side Inter de Bebedouro at the age of eight. He subsequently represented São Paulo, Grêmio, Barretos, and returned to his first club in 2017.

Lucas Barbosa joined Novorizontino in 2018, being loaned to FC Golden State White for the 2019 Dallas Cup. On 11 September 2019, he signed for Santos' under-20 side on loan.

On 16 September 2020, Lucas Barbosa signed a permanent five-year deal with Peixe, who paid R$ 300,000 for 80% of his economic rights. He made his first team debut the following 18 April, starting in a 2–1 Campeonato Paulista home win against Inter de Limeira.

Lucas Barbosa scored his first professional goal on 27 February 2022, netting his team's second in a 2–2 home draw against former side Novorizontino. He made his Série A debut on 9 April, replacing fellow youth graduate Marcos Leonardo in a 0–0 away draw against Fluimnense.

Career statistics

References

External links
Santos FC profile 

2001 births
Living people
People from Bebedouro
Brazilian footballers
Association football midfielders
Santos FC players
Campeonato Brasileiro Série A players
Footballers from São Paulo (state)